Anbara Salam Khalidi (4 August 1897–May 1986) was a Lebanese feminist, translator and author, who significantly contributed to the emancipation of Arab women.

Early life and education
Khalidi was born into an eminent Lebanese family in Beirut in 1897. She was the daughter of Salim Ali Salam, a deputy in the Ottoman parliament and a merchant, and her mother was a member of the leading families, namely the Barbir and Aghars. Her brother Saeb Salam served as the prime minister. Two of her brothers also held cabinet posts. One of her sisters was the wife of Rashid Karami, Lebanese prime minister.

In 1913 during the First Arab Congress in Paris Khalidi, along with two other women, sent a telegram to the congress. This telegram was the first message that was read aloud. She received a modern education and learned French. She and her siblings attended the Anglican Syrian College in Ras Beirut, which is the predecessor of the American University of Beirut. From 1925 to 1927 she studied in the United Kingdom.

Activities
After returning to Beirut, Khalidi joined the pioneering women's movement called Society for Women's Renaissance. She worked there on advancing women's role in society and politics, on encouraging national Lebanese products of textiles and fashion, and on establishing schools for women and advocating for women education. 

In 1927 Khalidi was invited by the American University of Beirut to speak about her time in England. Her speech was called "An Oriental Woman in England". Once she got on stage, she removed her veil. She was the first Muslim woman in Lebanon to publicly abandon the veil.

She was the first to translate Homer's Odyssey and Virgil's Aeneid into Arabic.

Her memoir was published in 1978 with the title of Jawalah fil Dhikrayat Baynah Lubnan Wa Filastin (Arabic: A Tour of Memories of Lebanon and Palestine). It was translated into English in 2013 under the title of Memoirs of an Early Arab Feminist. In her memoir, Khalidi emphasized the negative effects the activities of Jamal Pasha, Ottoman ruler of Syria, had on her family and her childhood.

Personal life and death
Anbara Salam married a Palestinian educator, Ahmad Samih Al Khalidi (died 1951) in 1929. It was his second marriage. He was the principal of the Arab College in Jerusalem in Mandatory Palestine. They settled in Jerusalem and then in Beirut. She died in Beirut in May 1986.

Dedication
Anbara Salam Khalidi was the subject of a Google Doodle on 4 August 2018, the 121st anniversary of her birth.

References

External links

20th-century Lebanese writers
20th-century poets
20th-century translators
20th-century women writers
1897 births
1986 deaths
American University of Beirut alumni
Khalidi family
Lebanese feminists
Lebanese Sunni Muslims
Lebanese translators
Lebanese women activists
Lebanese women writers
Salam family
Writers from Beirut
Lebanese women memoirists